East Kwaio is a single-member constituency of the National Parliament of Solomon Islands. Located on the east coast of the centre of the island of Malaita, it was established in 1976 when the Legislative Assembly was expanded from 24 to 38 seats.

List of MPs

Election results

2014

2010

2006

2001

1997

1993

1989

1984

1980

1976

References

Legislative Assembly of the Solomon Islands constituencies
Solomon Islands parliamentary constituencies
1976 establishments in the Solomon Islands
Constituencies established in 1976